Jaume Camprodon i Rovira (18 December 1926 – 26 December 2016) was a Catholic bishop.

Ordained to the priesthood in 1949, Camprodon i Rovina served as bishop of the Diocese of Girona, Spain, from 1973 until 2001. He was born in Torelló, Barcelona and died in Girona.

Notes

1926 births
2016 deaths
20th-century Roman Catholic bishops in Spain
Roman Catholic bishops from Catalonia